Independence is the fifth-largest city in Missouri and the county seat of Jackson County.  Independence is a satellite city of Kansas City, Missouri, and is the largest suburb on the Missouri side of the Kansas City metropolitan area.  In 2020, it had a total population of 123,011.

Independence is known as the "Queen City of the Trails" because it was a point of departure for the California, Oregon, and Santa Fe Trails.  It is the hometown of U.S. President Harry S. Truman, with the Truman Presidential Library and Museum, and the gravesites of Truman and First Lady Bess Truman. The city is sacred to the Latter Day Saint movement, as the home of Joseph Smith's 1831 Temple Lot, and the headquarters of several Mormon denominations.

History
Independence was originally inhabited by Missouri and Osage Native Americans, followed by the Spanish and a brief French tenure.  It became part of the United States with the Louisiana Purchase in 1803.  Lewis and Clark recorded in their journals that they stopped in 1804 to pick plums, raspberries, and wild apples at a site that would later form part of the city. Independence was also a stopping point for the "Donner Party", an ill fated group of 19th Century wagon train emigrants whose westward journey along the California Trail ended in disaster; spawning one of the most well known and taboo stories of pioneer era America.

Named after the Declaration of Independence, Independence was founded on March 29, 1827, and quickly became an important frontier town. Independence was the farthest point westward on the Missouri River where the steamboats or other cargo vessels could travel, due to the convergence of the Kansas River with the Missouri River approximately six miles west of town, near the current Kansas-Missouri border. Independence immediately became a jumping-off point for the emerging fur trade, accommodating merchants and adventurers beginning the long trek westward on the Santa Fe Trail.

In 1831, members of the Latter Day Saint movement began moving to the Jackson County, Missouri area.  Shortly thereafter, founder Joseph Smith declared a spot west of the Courthouse Square to be the place for his prophesied temple of the New Jerusalem, in expectation of the Second Coming of Christ.  Tension grew with local Missourians until the Latter Day Saints were driven from the area in 1833, the beginning of a conflict which culminated in the 1838 Mormon War.  Several branches of this movement gradually returned to the city beginning in 1867, with many making their headquarters there.  These include the Community of Christ (formerly the Reorganized Church of Jesus Christ of Latter Day Saints), the Church of Christ (Temple Lot), the Church of Jesus Christ (Cutlerite) and the Restoration Branches.

Independence saw great prosperity from the late 1830s through the mid-1840s, while the business of outfitting pioneers boomed.  Between 1848 and 1868, it was a hub of the California Trail.  On March 8, 1849, the Missouri General Assembly granted a home-rule charter to the town and on July 18, 1849, William McCoy was elected as its first mayor.  In the mid-19th century an Act of the United States Congress defined Independence as the start of the Oregon Trail.

Two important Civil War battles occurred at Independence: the first on August 11, 1862, when Confederate soldiers took control of the town, and the second in October 1864, which resulted in a Union victory.  The war took its toll on Independence and the town was never able to regain its previous prosperity, although a flurry of building activity took place soon after the war.  The rise of nearby Kansas City also contributed to the town's relegation to a place of secondary prominence in Jackson County, though Independence has retained its position as county seat to the present day.

United States President Harry S. Truman grew up in Independence, and in 1922 was elected judge of the county Court of Jackson County, Missouri (an administrative, not judicial, post).  Although he was defeated for reelection in 1924, he won back the office in 1926 and was reelected in 1930.  Truman performed his duties diligently, and won personal acclaim for several popular public works projects, including an extensive series of fine roads for the growing use of automobiles, the building of a new County Court building in Independence, and a series of 12 Madonna of the Trail monuments to pioneer women dedicated across the country in 1928 and 1929.  He would later return to the city after two terms as president.  His wife, First Lady Bess Truman, was born and raised in Independence, and both are buried there.  The Harry S. Truman National Historic Site (Truman's home) and the Harry S. Truman Presidential Library and Museum are both located in Independence, as is one of Truman's boyhood residences.

Geography
Independence is located at  (39.079805, −94.406551). It lies on the south bank of the Missouri River, near the western edge of the state.

Government
The Independence City Council is made up of six members. four are elected to represent one of the city districts, the other two are elected by the city as a whole. The City Mayor also sits on the City Council and serves as the "Head of Government" for the city, The Mayor can vote on legislation with the council but does not have the right to veto. Members serve a four-year term, beginning on January 1 following the election.

The Independence Municipal Court is currently seated by two members. Judges are appointed by the City Mayor and serve a 4-year term. Judges may be reappointed for multiple terms by the Mayor or the City Council.

Demographics

2010 census
As of the census of 2010, there were 116,830 people, 48,742 households, and 30,165 families residing in the city. The racial makeup of the city was 85.7% White, 5.6% African American, 0.6% Native American, 1.0% Asian, 0.7% Pacific Islander alone (1.0% Pacific Islander alone or in combination with one or more other races), 3.2% from other races, and 3.2% from two or more races. Hispanic or Latino of any race were 7.7% of the population. Non-Hispanic Whites were 82.2% of the population, down from 98.4% in 1970.

There were 48,742 households, of which 29.3% had children under the age of 18 living with them, 42.5% were married couples living together, 13.9% had a female householder with no husband present, 5.4% had a male householder with no wife present, and 38.1% were non-families. 31.7% of all households were made up of individuals, and 11.5% had someone living alone who was 65 years of age or older. The average household size was 2.37 and the average family size was 2.97.

The median age in the city was 39.4 years. 23% of residents were under the age of 18; 8.6% were between the ages of 18 and 24; 24.9% were from 25 to 44; 27.4% were from 45 to 64; and 16.1% were 65 years of age or older. The gender makeup of the city was 48.0% male and 52.0% female.

2000 census
As of the census of 2000, there were 113,288 people, 47,390 households, and 30,566 families residing in the city. Independence has a population of 111,806 in 1980 and 112,301 in 1990. The racial makeup of the city was 91.87% White, 2.59% African American, 0.70% Asian, 0.64% Native American, 0.46% Pacific Islander, 1.43% from other races, and 2.31% from two or more races. Hispanic or Latino of any race were 3.69% of the population.

There were 47,390 households, out of which 28.1% had children under the age of 18 living with them, 47.9% were married couples living together, 12.3% had a female householder with no husband present, and 35.5% were non-families. 30.1% of all households were made up of individuals, and 11.3% had someone living alone who was 65 years of age or older. The average household size was 2.37 and the average family size was 2.93.

In the city, the population was spread out, with 23.9% under the age of 18, 8.7% from 18 to 24, 28.9% from 25 to 44, 23.0% from 45 to 64, and 15.5% who were 65 years of age or older. The median age was 38 years. For every 100 females, there were 91.6 males. For every 100 females age 18 and over, there were 87.3 males.

The median income for a household in the city was $38,012, and the median income for a family was $45,876. Males had a median income of $34,138 versus $25,948 for females. The per capita income for the city was $19,384. About 6.4% of families and 8.6% of the population were below the poverty line, including 11.8% of those under age 18 and 6.7% of those age 65 or over.

Economy

Top employers
According to the town's 2016 Comprehensive Annual Financial Report, the top employers in the city are:

Education

Schools

Four school districts have areas within the city: Independence, Blue Springs, Fort Osage Schools, and Raytown. Three public high schools are located within the city limits: Truman High School, Van Horn High School, and William Chrisman High School; and two private high schools, Center Place Restoration School and Family Christian Academy, are also. Fort Osage High School is adjacent to but not inside the city limits.

Prior to Fall 2008, parts of western Independence in the Van Horn feeder pattern resided in the Kansas City, Missouri School District, but all of these students are now part of the Independence school district.

Colleges and universities
 Blue River Community College, part of the Metropolitan Community College system.
 Graceland University, Independence campus.  Main campus is in Lamoni, Iowa.

Churches
Independence played an important role in the early history of the Latter Day Saint movement, and is home to the headquarters of several separatist denominations of the Latter Day Saint movement, most notably the Community of Christ (formerly the Reorganized Church of Jesus Christ of Latter Day Saints), whose Temple is located there.  Other Latter Day Saint denominations headquartered in the city include the Church of Christ (Temple Lot) and the Church of Jesus Christ (Cutlerite), among others.  A number of Restoration Branches are also located in and around Independence, and the Church of Jesus Christ of Latter-day Saints maintains a visitor center in the town.

The Community of Christ has built a temple in Independence, and also maintains a large auditorium and other buildings nearby. The Church of Jesus Christ of Latter-day Saints operates a sizable visitors' center adjacent to the Community of Christ Temple, and across the street from the original Temple Lot designated by Joseph Smith in 1830.  The Lot itself is occupied by a small white-frame church building that serves as the headquarters and local meeting house for the Church of Christ (Temple Lot).

There are five Catholic churches and several Episcopal churches in Independence.

One of the oldest churches in Independence is the First Presbyterian Church, founded in 1826. It was here in 1890 that Harry Truman first met Elizabeth (Bess) Wallace.  Truman eventually married her after his return from World War I in 1919.

Libraries

 Midwest Genealogy Center, the largest stand-alone public genealogy research library in America.
 The Center for the Study of the Korean War, the largest Korean War archive in the U.S., at Graceland University.
 Merrill J. Mattes Research Library, focused on the Overland Trails, and the settlement of the American West.  Located at the National Frontier Trails Museum.
 Truman Library Research Center, at the Harry S. Truman Presidential Library and Museum.
 Jackson County Historical Society Archives & Research Library.
 Mid-Continent Public Library operates two general library branches in Independence.
 Kansas City Public Library operates the Trails West Branch in Independence.

Media

Newspapers
 The Examiner, Eastern Jackson County's daily newspaper. It is also referred to as The Independence Examiner.
 The Kansas City Star

Television
 KSMO-TV 62 – My Network TV affiliate operates a transmitter tower in western Independence, south of MO-12/Truman Rd.

Magazines
Space and Time, speculative fiction magazine

Culture

Santa-Cali-Gon Days is an annual Labor Day festival held in Independence intermittently since 1940 and continuously since 1973, celebrating the city's heritage as a starting point of three major frontier trails: the Santa Fe, California and Oregon. Santa-Cali-Gon gathers everyone in the town to vend to the populous and makes for a great time for all ages. Another popular annual festival is the Vaile Strawberry Festival, which is held on the first Saturday of June at the Vaile Mansion, 1500 N. Liberty, five blocks north of the historic Square.  The Independence Heritage Festival is a celebration of the diverse culture that exist in Independence.  The Independence town square features numerous family-owned shops surrounding the old main courthouse, which was modeled after Philadelphia's Independence Hall. This courthouse houses Harry S. Truman's former courtroom and office.

Museums
 National Frontier Trails Museum, 318 W. Pacific: Museum and interpretive center dedicated to the history of the Westward Expansion Trails and the settlement of the American West.  Independence, also known as the Queen City of the Trails, hosted thousands of settlers, pioneers, soldiers and merchants as they prepared to cross the plans along one of three trails: the Santa Fe, California, and Oregon.  The museum offers film, a children's activity room, artifacts, journal entries, maps, and covered wagons, among other highlights.
 Harry S. Truman Presidential Library and Museum: Official library of the 33rd U.S. president located at 500 U. S. 24 Highway. Hailed as America's "best presidential museum" by the Dallas Morning News, the Truman Library offers theaters, a museum, store, and interactive hands-on exhibits together with a Decision Theater. The museum contains a colorful mural by Thomas Hart Benton, Independence and the Opening of the West, together with a reproduction of the Oval Office.  The courtyard contains the graves of Harry, Bess and their daughter Margaret.  The museum seeks to educate patrons about the major world-shaping decisions that Truman was involved in as president, together with details of his personal life.  The lower level offers an area where children can dress up like Harry and Bess, explore "feely" boxes, engage in an interactive computerized race, sort mail, make campaign buttons and posters and play a trivia game.
 Owens-Rogers Museum: 100 W. Moore Street: Museum dedicated to Hollywood screenwriter and producer Lela Owens-Rogers and Academy Award-winning actress Ginger Rogers, who was born in this home in 1911. The home has been restored and reimagined as a museum with memorabilia, original movie posters, magazines, and items owned by Lela and Ginger Rogers. Visitors will learn the story of both amazing women, who changed the pay scale for women in the motion picture industry. Special items on display include a gown worn by Ginger Rogers to the 1967 Academy Awards and her Key to the City. The home was declared a Historic Landmark Property by the City of Independence in 1994, when Ginger Rogers visited for her birthday celebration. The museum has special events and displays throughout the season. Open April - September. 
 Leila's Hair Museum, 1333 S. Noland Road: Museum of Victorian-era art of hair jewelry and wreaths. The Hair Museum, believed to be the only one of its kind in the world, houses over 350 hair "wreaths" and 1,500 pieces of artwork or jewelry made partially or completely out of human hair.
 Puppetry Arts Institute, 11025 E. Winner Road: This non-profit organization is home to hundreds of puppets and marionettes from around the world and features a collection of remnants from the world's largest puppet factory which used to be in neighboring Kansas City, which was owned and operated by famous toy puppet creator Hazelle Rollins. Visitors can use the puppet resource library and see changing museum displays. Children can choose a puppet head from the now-closed factory inventory, paint it with professional puppet paint, attach a body, and stage an impromptu performance on one of the institute's stages. Monthly puppet shows performed by professional puppeteers are also performed.
 Harry S. Truman National Historic Site, 223 N. Main. The Truman home is operated by the National Park Service. It allows visitors to see how President Truman and his wife, Bess, lived in their simple but comfortable "Summer White House". Left just as it was when the Trumans lived there, you'll see their dishes on the table, books and records on the shelf, and Harry's hat, coat and cane in the front entry.
 1859 Jail, Marshal's Home and Museum, 217 N. Main. The dungeon-like cells of the 1859 Jail housed thousands of prisoners during the bloodiest period of Jackson County's history. Some of its famous guests included Frank James and William Clark Quantrill.  Part of the exhibit details how the local marshal and his family lived in the adjoining Federal brick two-story home. An 1870s-era schoolhouse and museum completes the site. A "historic homes combo" discount ticket is available for use with the Bingham-Waggoner Estate and the Vaile Mansion. Closed for the winter from January through March.
 Bingham-Waggoner Estate, 313 W. Pacific. Built in 1852 along the Santa Fe Trail, this magnificent home was owned by famous American Civil War artist George Caleb Bingham and later belonged to the Waggoner family, founders of the Waggoner-Gates Mill. Extensively renovated in the 1890s, many furnishings and accessories from the era may be seen in the home. A gift shop is located in the carriage house. Closed for the winter from January through March. 
 Chicago and Alton Depot, 318 W. Pacific. Built in 1879, this wooden depot is believed to be the oldest two-story frame railroad depot remaining in Missouri. Filled with hundreds of railroad artifacts, it also served as the living quarters for the station master and his family on the upper level, which is furnished with period treasures. Closed January–March.
 Vaile Mansion, 1500 N. Liberty. This thirty-one-room mansion was built by frontier business tycoon Harvey Vaile in 1881. Recognized as one of the finest examples of Second Empire Victorian architecture in the U.S., the opulent estate boasted conveniences such as flushing toilets, a built-in 6,000 gallon water tank, painted woodwork and ceilings and nine different marble fireplaces. Closed for the winter from January through March.
 Community of Christ International Headquarters. The Temple, at 201 S. River, and The Auditorium, across the street at 1001 W. Walnut, serve as world headquarters for this Christian denomination of a quarter-million members. Tours of the Temple and Auditorium are free, and organ concerts on world class organs are held daily in summer, and on Sundays from Labor day through Memorial Day.  The site also offers a theater, sacred artwork and a meditation garden. The Children's Peace Pavilion in the Auditorium is a free hands-on interactive museum for children.
 LDS Visitors Center, 937 W. Walnut. Describes the roles played by Latter-day Saints during the early and tempestuous history of Independence. Offers flat screen visual presentations showing the arrival of early Saints, revelations, and their pioneer lives. Also offers rare artifacts and exhibits documenting the history and beliefs of modern Saints, known as members of The Church of Jesus Christ of Latter-Day Saints. Free guided tours daily.

Sports
Blue River Community College features a soccer program with a men's team and women's team. The Trailblazers (men) went all the way to the NJCAA Region 16 semifinals before concluding their season. The Lady Trailblazers (women) finished as runners up in the region.  The Cable Dahmer Arena is home of the Kansas City Mavericks, a minor-league hockey team in the ECHL. Silverstein Eye Centers Arena is also the home of Kansas City Comets of the Major Arena Soccer League, the top level of professional indoor soccer. Crysler Stadium is the home of the collegiate summer baseball Independence Veterans of the Mid-Plains League.

Local recreational sports teams include:
 Pop Warner Little Scholars
 American Legion Baseball
 Blue Valley Activity Center (BVAC)

YMCA and Parks and Recreation have programs for various sports for all people.

Sister city
In 1978, Independence gained sister city status with Higashimurayama, Tokyo, Japan. Higashimurayama Street is south of Truman Rd. between Memorial Dr. and Lynn St., between City Hall and the Independence Square. This twinning is commemorated by a Zen Garden, near E Lexington Ave. and Memorial Dr.

Infrastructure

Highways and roads
  Interstate 70 – Major east–west interstate highway, connecting Independence to Kansas City, Columbia, and St. Louis.
  Interstate 470 – Follows MO-291 starting at 39th St./I-70 south into Lee's Summit.
  Interstate 435 – Runs just outside the western city limits, between Independence and Kansas City.
  U.S. Route 24 – A major east/west U.S. highway that links Independence with Kansas City and Buckner, and forms part of Independence's northern border with Sugar Creek. It passes through the Fairmount Business District, by the Truman Presidential Library and Museum, by William Chrisman High School, and north of the Independence Square. Parts of U.S. 24 are known as Winner Road, and Independence Avenue.
  U.S. Route 40 – Connects Independence with Lee's Summit, Lake Tapawingo, and Blue Springs, and forms part of Independence's southern border with Kansas City.
  Route 7 – Links U.S. 24 and Twyman Road (near Fort Osage High School) with Blue Springs, and passes by the Lake City Army Ammunition Plant.
  Route 12 is a short highway that connects the Independence Square to I-435 in Kansas City, and is commonly known as Truman Rd.
  Route 78 is an east–west highway that links Kansas City to MO-7, near the Lake City Army Ammunition Plant. Parts of MO-78 are known as 23rd St. (formerly E. Alton St.), and Lake City-Buckner Road.
  Route 291 – A minor north–south freeway, once designated as U.S. Route 71 Bypass, that links Independence to Lee's Summit, Sugar Creek, and Liberty. The Liberty Bend Bridge carries the highway across the Missouri River. I-470 carries the highway from I-70 south into Lee's Summit. Part of the former alignment, known as Old 71 Bypass, is a street in the Bass Pro area.
 Truman Road is a major arterial street that connects Independence with downtown Kansas City, and eastern unincorporated Jackson County. It passes by Van Horn High School, through the Maywood Business District, by President Harry S. Truman's house, and the Independence Square. Truman Road enters Independence with MO-12, and exits with State Route FF.

Hospital
 Centerpoint Medical Center

Transportation
 Amtrak Station
 Kansas City Area Transportation Authority (KCATA)

Utilities
Independence Power & Light (IPL) is a local electric power plant owned and operated by the city. It was established in 1901 and has undergone many changes and upgrades. One change was moving from the old Dodgion Street plant (where the Roger T. Sermon Center stands now) to the Blue Valley Plant near Truman Rd. and MO-78/Lake City-Buckner Rd. IPL also draws power from other sources: the Missouri City Power Plant, and the Kansas City Power and Light Company (KCP&L), through several 69 and 161 kilovolt transmission interconnections. IPL has an "Out of Sight" power line burial program. After signing an agreement with TradeWind Energy in July 2008, IPL will begin purchasing annually 15 megawatts of renewable energy from the Smoky Hills Wind Farm (a wind turbine facility) in Kansas.

Notable people
 Forrest "Phog" Allen, KU basketball coach, member of Hall of Fame; attended high school in Independence.
 John B. Arrington, Utah state legislator.
 Rudy Bears, professional mixed martial artist.
 George Caleb Bingham, 19th century artist.
 James L. Boldridge, celebrated African-American horse trainer 
 Jim Butcher, New York Times bestselling author.
 Teresa Carpenter, Pulitzer Prize-winning journalist.
 Margaret Truman Daniel, novelist, daughter of Harry and Bess Truman; born in Independence.
 Jim Eisenreich, Major League Baseball player; lived in Independence.
 Fatal1ty (Jonathan Wendel), professional e-sports player.
 EJ Gaines, football player for Missouri and NFL's Los Angeles Rams.
 Marla Hanson (born June 18, 1961) American screenwriter, ex-model and victim of a slashing attack by two other men hired by her landlord in 1986.
 Paul Henning, created TV series The Beverly Hillbillies, Green Acres, Petticoat Junction; born in Independence.
 Sam Hildreth, thoroughbred trainer; born in Independence.
 Arliss Howard, actor in films (Full Metal Jacket, The Lost World: Jurassic Park, Natural Born Killers, Moneyball) and TV (Rubicon, Medium); born in Independence.
 Sharon Kinne, serial killer currently at large
 Betty Lennox, former player for the WNBA.
 Bob Lewis, musician, co-founder of Devo.
 David McCullough, author and historian, lived in Independence while writing and researching his Pulitzer-winning biography of Harry Truman.
 Russ Morman, Major League Baseball outfielder and first baseman, coach; born in Independence.
 John Noland, black Confederate scout who served with Quantrill's Raiders, buried in Woodlawn cemetery.
 Ralph Peer, record producer in Country Music Hall of Fame; born in Independence.
 Austin Petersen, 2016 presidential candidate.
 Chris Pitman, Guns N' Roses keyboardist.
 Albert Pujols, St. Louis Cardinals first baseman; attended high school in Independence.
 Ginger Rogers, Academy Award-winning actress of musicals, dramas, and comedies; screen dancing partner of Fred Astaire; born in Independence.
 Charles E. Spahr, CEO, Standard Oil of Ohio.
 David Stover, NASCAR driver.
 Rick Sutcliffe, Major League Baseball pitcher and TV commentator; born in Independence.
 Tech N9ne (Aaron Yates), rapper and Strange Music vice president.
 George M. Todd, Confederate partisan ranger, buried in Woodlawn cemetery.
 Bess Truman, 33rd First Lady of the United States, was born in Independence.
 Harry S. Truman, Vice President and 33rd President of the United States, was raised in Independence.
 Ron Wallace, country music singer.
 Madisen Ward and the Mama Bear, folk singers.
 Margaret Weis, fantasy novelist.
 Cathay Williams, female black Civil War soldier.
 Hiram Young, self-freed slave turned wagon-building entrepreneur for the Oregon Trail, "Kansas City's First Colored Man of Means".

See also

 Independence Police Department
 Route of the Oregon Trail
 St. Joseph, Missouri

References

External links

 City's official website 
 Independence Chamber of Commerce
 Historic Sanborn Maps of Independence from University of Missouri Digital Library

 
California Trail
Cities in Clay County, Missouri
Cities in Jackson County, Missouri
Cities in Kansas City metropolitan area
Cities in Missouri
County seats in Missouri
Missouri populated places on the Missouri River
Oregon Trail
Populated places established in 1827
Santa Fe Trail
Significant places in Mormonism
1827 establishments in Missouri